The 13th Signal Regiment is a specialist signals unit of the Royal Corps of Signals of the British Army. Originally formed in 1934, the regiment had a long history of service before being disbanded in 1994 following the initial Options for Change reforms.  The regiment was be reformed in June 2020 as part of 1st Signal Brigade.

History

Formation
During the World War I, the Wireless Observation Groups of the Corps of Royal Engineers proven to be successful. As a result, a Royal Corps of Signals was planned to be formed in 1917 however, its formation was delayed until 1920. The 4th Wireless Signal Company (War Office Signals) was formed in 1934 at Aldershot Garrison to provide signal intelligence activities under the command of the War Office. In 1938, the company was re-titled as No. 2 Company, General Headquarters Signals.
The company later expanded its responsibility to provide secure communications for the army.

In September 1939, the unit was deployed to France as part of British Expeditionary Force. It was later evacuated at Dunkirk and renamed as the 1st Special Wireless Group on 18 July 1940. Following a short re-organisation, the group was deployed to the Middle East under the command of the 2nd Special Wireless Group.

Cold War Years 
During the Cold War years, the group was based in Minden and re-titled as the 1st Special Wireless Regiment. In August 1946, the regiment moved to Peterborough Barracks  and in 1950 in Nelson Barracks in Münster. By 1953, the regiment was moved as a result of an analysis of Soviet Forces in East Germany and by 1955, a brand new set of barracks was constructed in Wassenberg-Rothenbach, near Birgelen, on the German-Dutch Border. In 1959, as a result of the 1957 Defence White Paper reforms, the regiment was further renamed as 13th (Radio) Signal Regiment.

In 1994, the regiment was disbanded as part of the Options for Change reforms.

21st Century 
As a result of the Army 2020 Refine reforms the regiment was reformed on 1 June 2020 under the command of 1st (UK) Signal Brigade.

Structure 
The regiment's current structure is as follows:

 Regimental Headquarters, at Blandford Camp
 224 (Cyber Protection Teams) Signal Squadron
 233 (Global Communication Networks) Signal Squadron, at Basil Hill Barracks, MoD Corsham
 259 (Global Information Systems) Signal Squadron
 Combat Information Systems (CIS) Trails and Development Unit (CISTDU)
 Specialist Group Information Services (SGIS)

See also 

 Units of the Royal Corps of Signals

Notes

References

Sources 

 Lord, Cliff, and Graham Watson. The Royal Corps of Signals Unit Histories of the Corps (1920-2001) and Its Antecedents. Helion and Company, 2003. 
"Royal Signals". www.army.mod.uk. Retrieved 2019-10-20.
 Watson, Graham E. and Rinaldi, Richard A. The British Army in Germany (BAOR and After): An Organisational History 1947-2004 Tiger Lily Publications LLC 2005. 

Regiments of the British Army in World War II
Regiments of the Royal Corps of Signals
Military units and formations established in 1934